Josée Chouinard (born August 21, 1969) is a Canadian former competitive figure skater. She is the 1996 Champions Series Final bronze medallist and a three-time Canadian national champion (1991, 1993–1994). She finished in the top ten at two Winter Olympics.

Personal life 
Chouinard was born in Montreal, Quebec. In August 1997, she married Canadian pair skater Jean-Michel Bombardier. Their twins, Fiona and Noah, were born in January 2005. She and her husband separated  2006.

Career 
Chouinard began skating following the 1976 Winter Olympics, which she saw on television.

She won silver at the 1988 Nebelhorn Trophy, gold at the 1989 Karl Schäfer Memorial, and gold at the 1990 Skate Canada International. 
After taking her first national title, in January 1991, she was assigned to the 1991 World Championships in Munich, Germany. Ranked 8th in the short program and 5th in the free skate, she would finish 6th overall at her first ISU Championship. Subsequently, she won the Canadian figure skating championships in 1993 and 1994. 

Chouinard finished as high as 5th at the World Championships (1992 and 1994). She competed at the 1992 and 1994 Winter Olympics, finishing 9th on both occasions.

Chouinard began her coaching career in 1992, in Laval, Quebec. She later coached at the Granite Club in Toronto, Ontario (from 2002 to 2017) and at the Richmond Training Centre in Richmond Hill, Ontario.

Results
GP: Champions Series (Grand Prix)

Chouinard also won gold at the 2000 Sears Canadian Open.

References

1969 births
Canadian female single skaters
Figure skaters at the 1992 Winter Olympics
Figure skaters at the 1994 Winter Olympics
French Quebecers
Living people
Olympic figure skaters of Canada
Figure skaters from Montreal